Magnificent Ruffians aka "The Destroyers" is a Shaw Brothers film directed by Chang Cheh, starring the Venom Mob.

Plot
Lu Feng is the boss of a local town who uses the golden sword technique, however his kung fu is worthless as no one in the town knows kung fu anymore so there is no one to fight. All the skilled fighters left after Lu Feng took over all of the businesses in town except for the one owned by Lo Mang, his mother and his sister. Lu Feng also makes it a habit of inviting skilled fighters to his home with intentions to kill them just to keep his skills proficient. Daily, Lu Feng and his men harass Lo Mang and his family to give up their business, Lo Mang constantly refuses but Lu Feng doesn’t resort to using force as he is attracted to Lo Mang’s sister. Lo Mang doesn’t use force as whenever he starts to fight his mother calls him into the house. Kuo Chui, Sun Chien, Chiang Sheng and Wang Li are all kung fu experts who formerly worked in the now extinct escort business who have no homes or money. Initially they are strangers but meet after each of them manages to eat at a local restaurant (owned by Lu Feng) and escape without paying as the only way out is through traps which only a kung fu expert can get through. Lu Feng takes notice and recruits (tricks) the four into living in his home and giving them gifts in hopes of getting them to go and harass Lo Mang. The plan backfires as all of them share the same outlook on life and become friends, practicing kung fu daily and bringing each other food.

Lu Feng taking notice of their newly found friendship decides to set up Kuo Chui into killing Lo Mang by secretly putting explosives in his pole (since Kuo Chui is a pole expert). Kuo spars with Lo Mang and inadvertently sets off the explosives, killing Lo Mang. His friends, thinking he was hired by Lu Feng to kill Lo Mang, attack Kuo Chui but he refuses to fight his friends then runs away. Lu Feng arrives on the scene as he wants to "take revenge" for Lo Mang and kills Sun Chien and Wang Li while Chiang Sheng escapes. Lo Mang's mother and sister commit suicide, which they see as the only way to finally be rid of Lu Feng. Kuo Chui and Chiang Sheng eventually reunite and figure out it was a set-up by Lu Feng, they try to practice ad hoc only using what they have seen of Lu Fengs golden sword style and go to get revenge.

Cast
Kuo Chui
Lu Feng
Lo Mang
Chiang Sheng
Wang Li
Sun Chien
Yu Tai Ping

External links
 https://www.imdb.com/title/tt0079043/

1979 films
1979 martial arts films
Kung fu films
Hong Kong martial arts films
Shaw Brothers Studio films
Films directed by Chang Cheh
1970s Hong Kong films
1970s Mandarin-language films